Julian Jeffrey Gaston Chabot (born 12 February 1998) is a German professional footballer who plays as a centre-back for 1. FC Köln, on loan from Sampdoria.

Club career
Chabot started his career with Eintracht Frankfurt in 2010, before joining RB Leipzig in 2014; he joined the reserve squad in 2016. In 2017, he joined Sparta Rotterdam, and made his Eredivisie debut for the club on 12 August 2017 in a game against VVV-Venlo. He then joined FC Groningen in 2018; he made 29 competitive appearances for the club during the 2018–19 season, scoring a goal and providing one assist, helping the club to an eighth-place finish in the Eredivisie. 

On 24 May 2019, Chabot signed with Serie A club Sampdoria for €3.7 million, on a five-year contract that would keep him at the club until 30 June 2024; the deal officially went through on 1 July, once the transfer window had re-opened.
On 24 September 2020, Chabot joined Spezia on loan until 30 June 2021. On 26 January 2022, he joined 1. FC Köln on loan until 30 June 2023.

International career
Chabot was born in Germany and is of French descent. He is a youth international for Germany, and has represented the nation at U17, U19, and U20 level.

References

External links

1998 births
Footballers from Hesse
German people of French descent
Sportspeople from Hanau
Living people
Association football defenders
German footballers
Germany youth international footballers
Germany under-21 international footballers
RB Leipzig II players
Sparta Rotterdam players
FC Groningen players
U.C. Sampdoria players
Spezia Calcio players
1. FC Köln players
Eredivisie players
Serie A players
German expatriate footballers
Expatriate footballers in the Netherlands
German expatriate sportspeople in the Netherlands
Expatriate footballers in Italy
German expatriate sportspeople in Italy